

This is a list of the National Register of Historic Places listings in Potter County, Pennsylvania.

This is intended to be a complete list of the properties and districts on the National Register of Historic Places in Potter County, Pennsylvania, United States. The locations of National Register properties and districts for which the latitude and longitude coordinates are included below, may be seen in a map.

There are 5 properties and districts listed on the National Register in the county.

Current listings

|}

See also

 List of Pennsylvania state historical markers in Potter County

References

 
Potter County